Gregory Antiochos was a 12th-century Byzantine official and author.

Life and career
Gregory Antiochos was born in Constantinople, the capital of the Byzantine Empire, some time around 1125. He hailed from an obscure family, but his father, whose name is unknown was sufficiently to found a small female convent at the Forum Bovis. Antiochos was apparently an only child, and received an excellent education under Nicholas Kataphloron (whose funeral oration he held in 1160), Nicholas Hagiotheodorites, and Eustathius of Thessalonica. Closely tied to the capital's intellectual circles, already before 1159 he abandoned a literary career in favour of entering the civil service, soon becoming a member of the central imperial bureaucracy.

Before 1175 Antiochos was judge of the velon, and was sufficiently prominent to hold the funeral oration of Emperor Manuel I Komnenos on 22 January 1181. His career under the subsequent regency and the regime of Andronikos I Komnenos is unknown, but modern scholarship considers it plausible that he supported Andronikos, and was forced to resign under Isaac II Angelos. His subsequent fate, and the date of his death, are unknown. He had numerous children, of whom the oldest became a monk.

Works
Antiochos left a varied corpus of letters, speeches, eulogies and epitaphs, which are an important source for contemporary Byzantine history. In his work, he appears "a defender not only of imperial omnipotence, but also of the senate; he favored 'democratic' phraseology but stood aloof from military commanders". One of his chief influences was his teacher, Eustathius of Thessalonica. In his works, he "gives life to books and fruits, and endows animals with reason".

References

Sources
 
 

1120s births
12th-century Byzantine writers
Byzantine officials
Byzantine poets
People from Constantinople
Year of death unknown
Byzantine letter writers